Papaver croceum, common name ice poppy, is a species of flowering plant in the family Papaveraceae.

Description
It is a biennial or perennial herbaceous plant, with a basal rosette of long-stalked bluish-green lobed leaves. The stems are leafless and haired. They bloom from June to August. This plant is cultivated as an ornamental plant and erroneously sold under the name of Papaver nudicaule, that is instead a different species (Papaver nudicaule L. – common names Iceland poppy, Icelandic poppy).

Distribution
Papaver croceum is a native of southern Siberia, Central Asia, and northern China.

Habitat
Papaver croceum can be found in pasture, meadows, rocky slopes and landfill areas.

References

Pignatti S. - Flora d'Italia (3 voll.) - Edagricole – 1982
Biolib
Nature Gate
Panarctic Flora

croceum
Flora of Asia
Plants described in 1830